Calinda or Kalinda is a martial art and associated dance form of the Caribbean.

Calinda may also refer to:

Music
Calinda, a rhythmic style within the Bomba music of Puerto Rico
"Calinda", a standard melody of Louisiana Creole music
"Calinda", a single by Laurent Wolf
La Calinda, a ballet composed by Héctor Campos-Parsi
"La Calinda", an orchestral piece from the Florida Suite by Frederick Delius
"The Calinda", a single by Bing Crosby

Other 
 Calinda (bug), a bug genus in the family Triozidae
 Calynda, a city of ancient Caria
 Al Calinda, a character in the 1977 musical Working
 Calinda, a character in the 1976 film Drum

See also
Calends
Colindă, a traditional Christmas carol in Romania and Moldova
Kalenda (disambiguation)
Kalinda (disambiguation)